Saul Rosen (February 8, 1922 – June 9, 1991) was an American computer science pioneer.
He is known for designing the software of the first transistor-based computer Philco Transac S-2000, and for his work on programming language design which influenced the ALGOL language.

In 1947, he was involved in establishing the Association for Computing Machinery; in particular he was the first editor of its journal Communications of the ACM.
In 1979 he co-founded the journal Annals of the History of Computing, then published by AFIPS.

Selected publications

See also
 List of pioneers in computer science

References

External links
 
 Vita at rcac.purdue.edu
 Publications at DBLP
 Pictures of Rosen via cs.purdue.edu: 
 5 Apr 1966, handling a magnetic tape
 5 Apr 1966, at the typewriter
 30 Jul 1968, portrait

American computer scientists
1922 births
1991 deaths